Ocnogyna is a genus of moths in the family Erebidae from western Eurasia. The genus was erected by Julius Lederer in 1853. One aberrant species, Ocnogyna parasita, has females with non-functional wings, and because of this was formerly placed in its own genus Somatrichia, but is now in Ocnogyna.

Species
 Ocnogyna advena (Fabricius, 1787)
 Ocnogyna anatolica Witt, 1980
 Ocnogyna bellieri (Lederer, 1855)
 Ocnogyna bellieri berytta (Staudinger, 1895)
 Ocnogyna boeticum Rambur, 1836
 Ocnogyna clathrata (Lederer, 1855)
 Ocnogyna corsicum Rambur, 1832
 Ocnogyna corsicum sardoa Staudinger, 1870
 Ocnogyna herrichi Staudinger, [1879]
 Ocnogyna loewii (Zeller, 1846)
 Ocnogyna mutabilis Turati, 1924
 Ocnogyna nogelli Lederer, 1865
 Ocnogyna parasita (Hübner, 1790)
 Ocnogyna pudens (H. Lucas, 1853)
 Ocnogyna pudens leprieuri (Oberthür, 1878)
 Ocnogyna zoraida Graslin, [1837] 1836
 Ocnogyna zoraida hemigena (Graslin, 1850)

References

Spilosomina
Moth genera